Harald Tveit Alvestrand (born 29 June 1959) is a Norwegian computer scientist. He was chair of the Internet Engineering Task Force (IETF) from 2001 until 2005, succeeding Fred Baker. Within the IETF, Alvestrand was earlier the chair of the Areas for Applications from 1995 until 1997, and of Operations and Management in 1998.

Biography
Alvestrand was born in Namsos, Norway, received his education from Bergen Cathedral School and the Norwegian Institute of Technology, and has worked for Norsk Data, UNINETT, EDB Maxware, Cisco Systems, and Google.

He is an author of several important Request for Comments (RFCs), many in the general area of Internationalization and localization, most notable the documents required for interoperability between SMTP and X.400. Since the start of the use of OIDs he has run a front end to the hierarchy of assignments according to X.208.

At the end of 2007 Alvestrand was selected for the ICANN Board, where he remained until December 2010. In 2001 he became a member of the Unicode Board of Directors. He was a co-chair of the IETF EAI and USEFOR WGs.

Harald Alvestrand was the executive director of the Linux Counter organization. He was a member of the Norid Board, and the RFC Independent Submissions Editorial Board.  he lived in Trondheim, Norway, and has been working for Google since 2006.

Publications

Best Current Practices
  (BCP 15) Deployment of the Internet White Pages Service
  (BCP 18) IETF Policy on Character Sets and Languages
  (BCP 26) Guidelines for Writing an IANA Considerations Section in RFCs
  (BCP 27) Advancement of MIB specifications on the IETF Standards Track
  Tags for the Identification of Languages (was BCP 47)
  (BCP 92) The IESG and RFC Editor Documents: Procedures
  (BCP 95) A Mission Statement for the IETF

Other important RFCs
  X.400 Use of Extended Character Sets
  (this memo prepared the UTF-8 50-years plan in RFC 2277)
  Mapping between X.400 and RFC-822/MIME Message Bodies
  Content Language Headers (draft standard)
  Getting Rid of the Cruft (major RFC cleanup work)
  A Generalized Unified Character Code: Western European and CJK Sections (with John Klensin) April 1, 2008

References

External links

 
 Biography at ICANN

 
 

1959 births
Living people
Google employees
People from Namsos
Scientists  from Trondheim
Norwegian computer scientists
Norsk Data people
Chairpersons of non-governmental organizations
Norwegian Institute of Technology alumni
Scientists from Bergen
Cisco people